Pang Wah Hing was a Chinese footballer who played for the Chinese national football team.

Career statistics

International

International goals
Scores and results list China's goal tally first.

References

Chinese footballers
China international footballers
Association footballers not categorized by position